Shane Minor is the self-titled debut studio album by American country music artist Shane Minor. It contains the singles "Slave to the Habit", "Ordinary Love", and "I Think You're Beautiful", all of which entered the Billboard Hot Country Singles & Tracks (now Hot Country Songs) charts between 1999 and 2000. It is also Minor's only studio album.

Critical reception
Heather Phares of Allmusic rated the album three stars out of five and called it "a polished, accomplished debut from a promising talent." Entertainment Weekly critic Alanna Nash wrote, "With his big, impassioned vocals and layered MOR sound, Minor could be a major before year's end," giving the album a B. Jon Weisberger of Country Standard Time was less favorable, with his review calling it "about as generic as a radio-oriented country album can get."

Track listing

Personnel
Mike Brignardello – bass guitar
Mark Casstevens – banjo, mandolin
Paul Franklin – pedal steel guitar
Aubrey Haynie – fiddle
Dann Huff – electric guitar
David Huff – drums
Gordon Kennedy – electric guitar
Terry McMillan – harmonica, percussion
Gene Miller – background vocals
Shane Minor – lead vocals
Steve Nathan – piano, keyboard
Biff Watson – acoustic guitar

References

1999 debut albums
Mercury Nashville albums
Shane Minor albums
Albums produced by Dann Huff